Sastreria Cornejo S.A. is a company that specialises in costumes for film, television and theater. It is a Spanish company headquartered in Madrid. It was founded in 1920 by Humberto Cornejo.

Partial company filmography

Television Projects

References

Ver todas las producciones en Sastrería Cornejo, rental, period, costumes for cinema, theatre and television, and series, dressmaking workshops

External links
 Official Website (in Spanish)
 Info-Empresas (in Spanish)
 Cornejo on the IMDb

Film organisations in Spain
Clothing companies of Spain
Clothing companies established in 1920
Theatre in Spain
Spanish companies established in 1920
Companies based in Madrid